Lundersæter is a village in Kongsvinger Municipality in Innlandet county, Norway. Prior to 1964, this area was a part of Brandval municipality. Lundersæter Church, a primary school, and a community centre are all located in the village.

References

Kongsvinger
Villages in Innlandet